Malgino is a rural locality (a village) in Novlenskoye Rural Settlement, Vologodsky District, Vologda Oblast, Russia. The population was 58 as of 2002.

Geography 
Malgino is located 24 km southeast of Vologda (the district's administrative centre) by road. Chekmenevo is the nearest rural locality.

References 

Rural localities in Vologodsky District